ISO 3166-2:BE is the entry for Belgium in ISO 3166-2, part of the ISO 3166 standard published by the International Organization for Standardization (ISO), which defines codes for the names of the principal subdivisions (e.g. provinces or states) of all countries coded in ISO 3166-1.

Currently for Belgium, ISO 3166-2 codes are defined for two levels of subdivisions:
 3 regions
 10 provinces

Each code consists of two parts, separated by a hyphen. The second part is three letters. For the provinces, the first letter indicates the region where the province is in:
 V: Flemish Region
 W: Walloon Region

Current codes
Subdivision names are listed as in the ISO 3166-2 standard published by the ISO 3166 Maintenance Agency (ISO 3166/MA).

ISO 639-1 codes are used to represent subdivision names in the following administrative languages:
 (fr): French
 (nl): Dutch

Click on the button in the header to sort each column.

Regions

 Notes

Provinces

Changes
The following changes to the entry have been announced in newsletters by the ISO 3166/MA since the first publication of ISO 3166-2 in 1998. ISO stopped issuing newsletters in 2013.

The following changes to the entry are listed on ISO's online catalogue, the Online Browsing Platform:

See also
 Subdivisions of Belgium
 FIPS region codes of Belgium
 NUTS codes of Belgium

External links
 ISO Online Browsing Platform: BE
 Provinces of Belgium, Statoids.com

2:BE
ISO 3166-2
ISO 3166-2
Belgium geography-related lists